Brynley Charles Gunn (born 21 August 1958, in Kettering) is an English former footballer who played as a full-back for a number of clubs between 1975 and 1996. He is best remembered for his time with Nottingham Forest, with which he won the 1979–80 European Cup, coming on as a substitute in the final. His daughter, Jenny, played cricket for England, and was part of the Ashes-winning team of 2005.

Career statistics

Club

Honours
Nottingham Forest
European Cup: 1979–80

References

External links
Nottingham Forest career record at Sporting Heroes

1958 births
Living people
Sportspeople from Kettering
English footballers
Association football defenders
Nottingham Forest F.C. players
Shrewsbury Town F.C. players
Walsall F.C. players
Mansfield Town F.C. players
Peterborough United F.C. players
Chesterfield F.C. players
Arnold Town F.C. players
English Football League players
UEFA Champions League winning players
Footballers from Northamptonshire